Narbonne Cathedral (Cathédrale Saint-Just-et-Saint-Pasteur de Narbonne) is a Roman Catholic church located in the town of Narbonne, France. The cathedral is a national monument and dedicated to Saints Justus and Pastor.

It was the seat of the Archbishop of Narbonne until the Archbishopric was merged into the Diocese of Carcassonne under the Concordat of 1801. (The title, however, passed to the Archbishop of Toulouse.) The church was declared a basilica minor in 1886. It is now a co-cathedral of the Diocese of Carcassonne and Narbonne, as it has been called since 2006.

The building, begun in 1272, is noted for being unfinished.

History

The cathedral is situated in the heart of the present city of Narbonne, but in the Middle Ages was located by the city wall.  This placement was due to a long history of the site as a place of worship.  In 313, just after the Edict of Milan, a Constantinian basilica was erected on approximately the same spot as the present cathedral.

Ruined by a fire in 441, it took 37 days to demolish those parts of the basilica that had escaped destruction. Then a Latin basilica was constructed by Bishop Rusticus, who was encouraged in his work by the Gaulish prefect, Marcellus. The basilica was finished on November 29, 445.  Originally dedicated to Saint Genesius of Arles, it was re-dedicated in 782 to the young Spanish martyrs Saint Justus and Pastor. Little remains of this building: two Roman columns from the former forum, used in the nave, can now be seen in the present cloister; the lintel and an aedicule of white marble can now be seen in the Lapidary Museum of Narbonne.

A Carolingian cathedral was erected in 890 by Archbishop Theodard (d. 893). Its steeple, largely restored, is visible from the cloister. Yet despite the help given to it by three popes, this church fell into ruin.

The idea to build a Gothic cathedral was a political decision made in 1268 by Pope Clement IV, the former archbishop of Narbonne. He decided that it would be a monument made in the magnificent style of the Kingdom of France. The construction of the new cathedral was supposed to begin in 1264, but did not actually start until 1272. The first stone of the current cathedral was laid by Archbishop Maruin on April 13, 1272, in the foundation of the current Chapel of the Sacred Heart.

The choir was finished in 1332, but the rest of the building was never completed, as the result of many factors including sudden changes in the economic status of Narbonne, its unusual size and geographical location (to complete it would have meant demolishing the city wall) and financial constraints.

References

Former cathedrals in France
Narbonne
Basilica churches in France
Churches in Aude
Monuments historiques of Aude
Unfinished cathedrals